The Impossible Years is a 1968 American comedy film directed by Michael Gordon, and starring David Niven, Lola Albright, Chad Everett, Ozzie Nelson, Cristina Ferrare, Gale Dixon and Darlene Carr. It is based upon the 1965 play of the same name, and was adapted for the screen by George Wells.

The eponymous theme song was written by The Tokens and performed by The Cowsills.

Plot
Jonathan Kingsley, an author of numerous books on parenting, is a professor of psychiatry at the local university. He and wife Alice are raising two teenage daughters; the elder, Linda, 17, begins to display uncharacteristic behavior: walking as if on air, smiling incessantly for no reason, cleaning up her room daily, showing politeness toward her little sister, and more. It is suspected that she has lost her virginity while on a school field trip to Catalina Island, and Kingsley's general practitioner confirms this. Linda, while being interrogated, admits as much, and she reveals that she is married. She insists on concealing the identity of her husband until the film's surprising conclusion.

Cast

Production
MGM bought the film rights to the play in 1965 for $350,000. George Wells completed the script by March 1966. MGM announced it for production in August 1966. The movie was greenlit by the team of Robert O'Brien and Robert M. Weitman. Filming took place in October 1967.

At one stage, Peter Sellers was announced for the lead but by May, David Niven had been signed. Christina Ferrare, who played Niven's nubile daughter, had been under contract to 20th Century Fox for a year. The film featured the final movie performance of Ozzie Nelson.

Release
The Impossible Years premiered at New York City's Radio City Music Hall on December 5, 1968.

Box office
The film was a box-office hit, earning $5.8 million in rentals in North America, making it the 17th most popular movie at the U.S. box office in 1969.

Critical response
Critical reaction to The Impossible Years was overwhelmingly negative. In 1970, it was reported Jackie Cooper and Bob Finkel had written a pilot script for a TV adaptation of the play for NBC.

Home media
The Warner Archive Collection released The Impossible Years on an MOD DVD-R on May 16, 2011.

References

External links

1968 films
1968 comedy films
1960s coming-of-age comedy films
American coming-of-age comedy films
American films based on plays
Films directed by Michael Gordon
Films scored by Don Costa
Films set in universities and colleges
Metro-Goldwyn-Mayer films
Films with screenplays by George Wells
1960s English-language films
1960s American films